Copelatus ragazzii is a species of diving beetle. It is part of the genus Copelatus in the subfamily Copelatinae of the family Dytiscidae. It was described by Régimbart in 1877.

References

ragazzii
Beetles described in 1877